Pierre-Antoine Martini (born June 27, 1988 in Marseille) is a French footballer, and is currently without a club. He last played for Livingston in the Scottish Football League First Division. He is a goalkeeper.

External links

1988 births
Living people
Association football goalkeepers
French footballers
OGC Nice players
Livingston F.C. players
Scottish Football League players
French expatriate footballers
Expatriate footballers in England
Expatriate footballers in Scotland